The Arab Socialist Union may refer to:
Arab Socialist Union (Egypt), active 1962–78
Arab Socialist Union (Iraq), active 1964–68
Libyan Arab Socialist Union, active 1971−77
Arab Socialist Union Party (Syria), founded in 1973
Democratic Arab Socialist Union (Syria), founded in 1980

See also
Socialist Union (disambiguation)
Unified Political Command